Thayetchaung Township is a township of Dawei District in the Taninthayi Division of Burma (Myanmar). The principal town is Thayetchaung.

Subdivisions
Thayetchaung Township is composed of 39 rural tracts, and one urban tract, Thayetchaung. The rural tracts are:

Notes

External links
 "Thayetchaung Google Satellite Map" Maplandia World Gazetteer

Townships of Taninthayi Region